Nigilgia albitogata is a moth in the family Brachodidae. It was described by Walsingham in 1891. It is found in South Africa and Gambia.

References

Natural History Museum Lepidoptera generic names catalog

Brachodidae
Moths described in 1891